The Cabinet of the Prime Minister's Office, officially Cabinet of the Presidency of the Government, is a political and technical assistance body 
at the service of the Prime Minister of Spain. The Cabinet of the Prime Minister is composed of multiple departments directly responsible to the Premier and coordinated by the Chief of Staff. The Cabinet Office, the officials that work on it, their offices and the departments make up the Office of the Prime Minister.

Responsibilities
The functions of the Cabinet of the Prime Minister's Office are freely established by the Premier through a Royal Decree signed by the Monarch. The duties of the Cabinet Office are truly focused on assisting the Premier because most of the functions over Government coordination and Council of Ministers supporting are assumed by the Ministry of the Presidency. The current duties are:

 Providing the Prime Minister with the political and technical information that is necessary for the exercise of its functions.
 Advising the Prime Minister in those matters and stuff that its disposes.
 Knowing the programs, plans and activities of the different ministerial departments, with the purpose of facilitating the Prime Minister its duties as coordinator of the Government's action.
 Assisting the Prime Minister in matters related to Economic Policy.
 Advising the Prime Minister on matters of National Security.
 Carrying out those other activities or functions entrusted to it by the Prime Minister.

It is also responsible for the security of the Government members and their families, protocol, human resources and Government healthcare, although this duties are carried out by the Secretary-General.

History
The Cabinet was created for the first time in 1976, with the arrival of Adolfo Suárez to the premiership. Despite having been created in 1976, the Cabinet Office wasn't officially regulated until September 1978. The Royal Decree was very short and it only said that the Cabinet was and advisory body to the Prime Minister with the functions that the Primer would like to grant to it.

With prime minister Felipe González the Cabinet Office grow up establishing new departments and functions like knowing the ministerial departments plans. Moreover, at this time the Secretary of State for Relations with the Cortes and the Office of the Spokesperson of the Government depended it from the Cabinet Office.

Prime minister José María Aznar elevated the rank of the Cabinet Office from Undersecretariat to Secretariat of State and continued boosting the Cabinet. Prime minister José Luis Rodrígez Zapatero didn't made many changes, with the exception of the creation of the Economic Office.

It was during the premiership of Mariano Rajoy when the Cabinet Office was granted with the powers that it has today. Most of the current departments were created at that time and in 2012 it granted the Cabinet responsibilities over national security by creating the Department of Homeland Security and granting the Deputy Chief of Staff the direction of the department. With Rajoy the Cabinet Office also received responsibilities over the Government communication policy by asumming the Secretariat of State for Press.

Prime minister Pedro Sánchez suppressed the Economic Office in 2018 and created in its place the Department for Economic Affairs. He also boosted the international matters by creating the General Secretariat for International Affairs, European Union, G20 and Global Security with rank of Undersecretariat in replace of the Department for International Affairs, that had rank of Directorate-General. Finally, he gave more autonomy to the Department of Homeland Security by separating the offices of Deputy Chief of Staff and Director of the Homeland Security Department in two different officials.

High-officials
The high-officials of the Cabinet are directly nominated by the Prime Minister and appointed by the Monarch.

Current departments
The current Prime Minister Pedro Sánchez structured its personal Cabinet in the following way:

Office of the Chief of Staff

The Office of the Chief of Staff is composed by the Moncloa Chief of Staff and its advisers.

Office of the Deputy Chief of Staff
The Office of the Deputy Chief of Staff is composed by the Deputy Chief of Staff and four departments:
 The Department for National Affairs. Responsible for the matters on education, science, culture, health, social policies, justice and policing.
 The Department for Economic Affairs. Responsible for the matters on macroeconomic, financial, social and labour policies
 The Directorate for Institutional Affairs. Responsible for relations between the Office of the Prime Minister and other institutions and agencies.
 The Department for Communication with Citizens. Responsible for managing the communications between the Office of the Prime Minister and the citizens.

General Secretariat

Led by the Secretary-General of the Prime Minister's Office, the General Secretariat duties are:
 Organizating and security of the activities of the Prime Minister, both in the national territory and in their movements abroad.
 Coordinating of the support activities and protocol to the Prime Minister in its relationship with the remaining powers of the State.
 Assisting to the different bodies of the Prime Minister's Office in matters of economic administration, personnel, maintenance and conservation, information and communication means.
 Coordinating of logistics programs and devices for travel abroad by Spanish Government Authorities.
 Supervising of the Health Operating System of the Prime Minister's Office.
 Executing those other activities or functions entrusted to it by the Premier.

The General Secretariat is composed by three departments:
 Office of the Deputy Secretary-General. Led by the Deputy Secretary-General, it assists the Secretary-General; it coordinates the media of both Prime Minister's Office and Ministry of the Presidency; it assists the Press Offices of the State High Officials and it develops the transparency policy.
 Department of Security. It is responsible for the security of the Palace of Moncloa, the Prime Minister, the Deputy Prime Minister, the Ministers, their families and other officials and buildings that the Chief of Staff considers to need protection.
 Department of Protocol. It coordinates the travels of the Prime Minister and the Deputy Prime Minister; it organizes the meetings of the Prime Minister in the national territory with national or international authorities and it coordinates the protocol.

Because they share assistance duties to the Prime Minister, both Secretary-General and Undersecretary of the Presidency coordinate together their work.

General Secretariat for International Affairs
The General Secretariat for International Affairs, European Union, G20 and Global Security advices and gives technical and political support to the Premier in all its international activity and in multilateral and global affairs.

The General Secretariat is composed by two departments:
 The Department for International Affairs and Global Security.
 The Department for European Affairs and G20.

Directorate for Analysis and Studies
It is a department of management of some of the functions entrusted to the Cabinet.

Department of Homeland Security

The Department of Homeland Security or Department of National Security, created in 2012 and regulated by the National Security Act of 2015, is the department of the Cabinet Office responsible for collecting and analysing information of interest for national security and advising the Prime Minister on such matters.

The Director of the Department was, until 2018, the Deputy Chief of Staff of the Cabinet. The director is a member of the National Security Council along with the Chief of Staff.

The headquarters of the department are located in the bunker of the Palace of Moncloa.

References

1976 establishments in Spain
Government of Spain
Spain
Spanish Prime Minister's Office